Geheimnis des blauen Zimmers is a 1932 German mystery film directed by Erich Engels and starring Theodor Loos, Else Elster and Hans Adalbert Schlettow.

The film began shooting on 28 October 1932 at Tempelhof Studios in Berlin.

It was remade by Universal Studios in the United States as The Secret of the Blue Room.

Cast
 Theodor Loos as Robert von Hellberg 
 Else Elster as Irene von Hellberg 
 Hans Adalbert Schlettow as Marineoffizier Axel Brinck 
 Wolfgang Staudte as Frank Färber 
 Peter Wolff as Thomas Brandt 
 Oskar Sima as Kriminalkommissar Schuster 
 Gerhard Dammann as Kriminalbeamter Krüger 
 Paul Henckels as Diener Paul 
 Betty Bird as Zofe Betty 
 Reinhold Bernt as Chauffeur Max 
 Bernhard Goetzke as Fremder 
 Else Wunsch as Dienstmädchen Marie

References

Bibliography

External links 
 

1932 films
1932 mystery films
Films of the Weimar Republic
German mystery films
1930s German-language films
Films directed by Erich Engels
German black-and-white films
Films shot at Tempelhof Studios
1930s German films